Yang Naimei (1904 – December 27, 1960) was an actress of China's silent film era. She starred in such well-received films as The Soul of Yuli (1924), Orchid in an Empty Valley (1926), Spring Dream by the Lakeside (1927) and The Young Mistress' Fan (1928).

In 1926–28 Yang played lead roles in films which put her among the top-ranked Chinese film actresses of the 1920s.

Career 
Yang's breakthrough role was in The Soul of Yuli (1924), where she played a dissolute playgirl who wouldn't settle down after marriage. Yang then played lead roles in The Poor Children and Lured into Marriage.

In 1928 Yang opened the Naimei Film Company which produced one film in the same year, An Extraordinary Woman. Yang retired from acting in the mid-1930s.

References

External links
Yang Naimei 杨耐梅: A Playgirl's Brief Candle
 Yang Naimei at wfpp.columbia.edu
 Nai-Mei Yang at imdb.com

Chinese silent film actresses
1904 births
1960 deaths
Chinese film actresses
Actresses from Shanghai
20th-century Chinese actresses
Women film pioneers
Chinese women screenwriters
20th-century screenwriters